is a Japanese singer and live streamer. He is a member of the J-pop group Strawberry Prince.

Biography 

Root was recruited by Nanamori to join Strawberry Prince in mid-2016. On October 30, 2019, he released his first solo album, Kimi to Boku no Himitsu Kichi, as well as a mini-album, Kimi to Boku no Story. Kimi to Boku no Himitsu Kichi sold over 30,000 copies on its release day and placed fourth in the Oricon weekly album ranking, while Kimi to Boku no Story placed twelfth on the Oricon weekly album ranking.

From 2018 to 2019, Root played the character of Kippei Nemuri in HoneyWorks's fictional idol unit "Dolce". He recorded one album with the group before it disbanded.

Root's music has been featured in other media. The song "Garakuta Reboot" was used as the ending theme for the movie Fukkō Ōen Masamune Datenicle Gattai-ban+, and the song "Wasure Ai" was used as background music in Lawson and Family Mart stores throughout Japan.

Discography

Albums

Mini albums

Extended plays

Singles

Filmography

Video games

References

External links 

 Official YouTube channel

Living people
Japanese male pop singers
1998 births
Utaite
Japanese YouTubers
People from Tochigi Prefecture